Eduardo Amorim (born March 17, 1963) is a Brazilian politician. He has represented Sergipe in the Federal Senate since 2011. Previously he was a deputy from Sergipe from 2007 to 2011 and secretary of state of Sergipe from 2003 to 2004. He is a member of the Brazilian Social Democracy Party (PSDB).

References

Living people
1963 births
Members of the Federal Senate (Brazil)
Brazilian Social Democracy Party politicians
People from Sergipe